is a railway station located in the city of Tsuruoka, Yamagata Prefecture, Japan, operated by the East Japan Railway Company (JR East).

Lines
Sanze Station is served by the Uetsu Main Line, and is located  rail kilometers from the terminus of the line at Niitsu Station.

Station layout
The station has one side platform and one island platform connected to the station building by a footbridge. The station is unattended.

Platforms

History
Sanze Station was opened on May 22, 1922. A new station building was completed in November 1981. With the privatization of the JNR on April 1, 1987, the station came under the control of the East Japan Railway Company.

Surrounding area

Sanze Post Office

See also
List of railway stations in Japan

External links

 JR East Station information 

Stations of East Japan Railway Company
Railway stations in Yamagata Prefecture
Uetsu Main Line
Railway stations in Japan opened in 1922
Tsuruoka, Yamagata